The Joint Court of Justice of Aruba, Curaçao, Sint Maarten, and of Bonaire, Sint Eustatius and Saba serves the three Caribbean countries of the Kingdom of the Netherlands (Aruba, Curaçao, and Sint Maarten) and the three Caribbean special municipalities of the Netherlands (Bonaire, Sint Eustatius, and Saba).  The court primarily hears disputes in first instance and on appeal of these six islands, and is on the same level as similar courts in the Netherlands. Since 2012, the court has also been authorized to hear inquiry procedures originated on Curaçao, of a type that would be heard in the Netherlands by the Enterprise Chamber in Amsterdam.

The Court has seats in courthouses located on Aruba, Curaçao, and Sint Maarten, and also is authorized to hold sessions on Bonaire, Sint Eustatius and Saba.  Until the dissolution of the Netherlands Antilles, 2010, it was called the Joint Court of Justice of the Netherlands Antilles and Aruba.

Court locations
The Joint Court includes four courts of first instance, which have session on 6 regular Court locations. Appeals are heard in  3 locations, but may also be heard on the remaining 3 islands. An overview of court locations is shown below

Composition 
Judges for both first instance cases and on appeal are taken from a single pool of judges. The Courts of first instance sit as a single judge, while the appeal session are headed by a 3-judge panel. Judges that took part in a case at the lower level may not participate in the same case on appeal.

Right of appeal 
Most decisions of the court of appeal may be appealed "in cassatie" to the Supreme Court of the Netherlands in The Hague. Decisions of the Supreme Court are final and do not address the facts of the case, but only points of law: whether the decision was based on the right legal grounds and properly motivated. The legal basis for those appeals is the Regulation of 20 July 1961, Stb.  1961, 212, titled the "Cassatieregeling Nederlandse Antillen" ("Appeals Regulations of the Netherlands Antilles"), later renamed "Cassatieregeling Nederlandse Antillen en Aruba".

One distinction between the appeals procedure in the Netherlands and that of the Caribbean territories is that when a judgment of a Netherlands court is overturned by the Supreme Court, the case is generally remanded to a different court at the lower level for purposes of rendering a new decision.  Because the Joint Court is the only court at its level, it will rehear its own cases after being overruled. Another distinction is that clients may be represented by lawyers of the Caribbean islands, rather than lawyers registered with the court of The Hague.

See also
 Constitutional Court of Sint Maarten

References

External links 
Official website (Dutch)
Official website (English)

Government in the Dutch Caribbean
Courts in North America
Courts in the Netherlands
Law in the Caribbean
Government of Aruba
Government of Bonaire
Government of Curaçao
Government of Saba (island)
Government of Sint Eustatius
Government of Sint Maarten
Government of the Netherlands Antilles
Government of the Netherlands
Aruban law
Curaçao law
Courts and tribunals with year of establishment missing